Zoram Sangliana (1955/1956 – 24 April 2021) was an Indian politician and Member of the Mizoram Legislative Assembly for Kolasib from 2008 to 2018. Sangliana died from COVID-19 aged 65.

References

1950s births
Year of birth uncertain
2021 deaths
Mizoram MLAs 2008–2013
Mizoram MLAs 2013–2018
Deaths from the COVID-19 pandemic in India
Indian National Congress politicians from Mizoram
People from Kolasib district